PS, I Love You is the debut novel by Irish writer Cecelia Ahern, published in 2004. It claimed the number one best-seller status in Ireland, Britain, the United States, Germany, and the Netherlands, and was on the number one spot in Ireland for nineteen weeks.

Plot
Holly and Gerry are a married couple who live in Dublin. They are deeply in love, but they fight occasionally. By winter that year, Gerry suddenly dies of a brain tumor and Holly realizes how much he means to her as well as how insignificant their arguments were.

Deeply distraught, Holly withdraws from her family and friends out of grief until her mother calls her informing her of a package addressed to her. Within the package are ten envelopes, one for each month after Gerry died, containing messages from him, all ending with "P.S. I Love You". As the months pass, each new message fills her with encouragement and sends her on a new adventure. With Gerry's words as her guide, Holly slowly embarks on a journey of rediscovery.

Characters
Holly Kennedy: Gerry's wife, Sharon's best friend
Gerry Clark: Holly's husband, John's best friend
Sharon McCarthy: Holly's best friend, John McCarthy's wife
John McCarthy: Gerry's best friend, Sharon McCarthy's husband
Denise Hennessey: Holly and Sharon's best friend
Tom O'Connor: Denise's husband
Daniel Connolly: Holly's friend and suitor
Elizabeth Kennedy: Holly's mother
Frank Kennedy: Holly's father
Richard Kennedy: Holly's older brother
Meredith Kennedy: Richard's former wife
Timothy "Timmy" Kennedy: Meredith and Richard's son
Emily Kennedy: Meredith and Richard's daughter
Jack Kennedy: Holly's brother
Abbey Kennedy: Jack's wife
Ciara Kennedy: Holly's sister
Mathew: Ciara's boyfriend
Declan Kennedy: Holly's brother
Leo: Holly's hair stylist
Chris Feeney: Holly's boss
Alice Goodyear: Holly's colleague
Laura: Daniel's former girlfriend
Barbara: Travel agent
Charlie: Bartender

Reception
Despite the hype and commercial success, the debut novel from Cecilia Ahern, daughter of Irish political figure Bertie Ahern, drew negative reception. Raidió Teilifís Éireann (RTÉ) gave it three out of five stars, stating that Ahern's book is "funny and emotional", but also criticising the book's message of getting over the death of a loved one by "getting drunk and shopping". The Guardian wrote a satirical review which lampooned Ahern's shallow characterisation and melodramatic plot. The Clare County library called the book "overhyped", "predictable" and "full of stock characters", but lastly an "easy read... and a nice holiday read". Amazon.co.uk calls it "at times repetitive and her delivery is occasionally amateurish [but] Ahern deserves credit for a spirited first effort".

Movie adaptation

A film adaptation of the book was released in 2007 with Hilary Swank as Holly, and Gerard Butler as her husband, Gerry. James Marsters plays John McCarthy and Jeffrey Dean Morgan plays William Gallagher. The cast includes Kathy Bates, Harry Connick, Jr., Gina Gershon and Lisa Kudrow. Filming began in October 2006 in New York City and Ireland, and the movie was released on 21 December 2007 in the United States.

Although box office numbers were high, critics gave the film negative reviews.

Notes

Sources

2004 Irish novels
Novels by Cecelia Ahern
Cengage books
Irish novels adapted into films
2004 debut novels
Novels set in Dublin (city)